Kora-class corvettes are guided missile corvettes, in active service with the Indian Navy and the National Coast Guard of Mauritius. Four vessels were built at Garden Reach Shipbuilders and Engineers (GRSE) and outfitted at Mazagon Dock Limited (MDL).

Design 
The primary role of the Kora class is as surface combatants. They are armed with four quad-launchers for 3M-24 anti-ship missiles (Russian: Kh-35 Uran, NATO: SS-N-25 Switchblade). They are powered by two diesel engines. A HAL Chetak or HAL Dhruv helicopter can operate from the vessel. INS Kulish is equipped with two Igla surface-to-air missile launchers.
 
The corvettes are armed with a  AK-176 dual-purpose gun and two  AK-630 CIWS.

The sensor suite includes a MR-352 Pozitiv-E (Cross Dome) air or surface search radar, Bharat 1245 navigation radar and BEL Rani navigation radar. Fire control is provided by Garpun-Bal and MR-123 radars.

The corvettes are fitted with the Ajanta P Mk II Electronic Support Measures system. There are four PK-10 chaff launchers and two towed torpedo decoys to deceive incoming anti-ship missiles and torpedoes. PK-10 is a 10 tube  barrage chaff launcher that can fire 80 rounds at a time.

The Kora class is powered by two diesel engines driving two controllable pitch propellers through two shafts. Four diesel alternators rated at 350kW are provided for power generation.

History 
The Kora-class corvettes were designed by India's Naval design bureau under Project 25A, as a replacement for the Russian-designed Petya II-class corvettes of the Indian Navy. The first two were ordered in April 1990 and latter two in October 1994. The class was to be outfitted with the Trishul SAM, but following the cancellation of the Trishul project, a shoulder-launched SAM was adopted.

INS Kora undertook a goodwill visit to Singapore in mid-2001. The corvette participated in the Republic of Singapore Navy Day celebrations followed by the International Maritime Defence Exhibition (IMDEX) Asia 2001. The participation of INS Kora in the International Maritime Defence Exhibition was a showcase of the Indian shipbuilding industry and its indigenous efforts.

Export 
In 2012, it was reported that Mauritius had ordered 2 vessels based on this class from the Garden Reach Shipbuilders.

Ships of this class

Gallery

See also 
 List of active Indian Navy ships

References 

 
Corvette classes
Ships built in India